5IT was a British Broadcasting Company (later BBC) radio station which broadcast from Birmingham, England, between 1922 and 1927. 

Birmingham was the first British city outside London to have a radio service from the newly formed British Broadcasting Company, with 5IT starting regular broadcasting from its Witton base at 17:00 on 15 November 1922, one day after 2LO started daily BBC broadcasting from London and one hour before the 18:00 launch of Manchester's 2ZY. 5IT pioneered many innovations in early broadcasting, launching Children's Hour in 1922, developing sophisticated methods of programme control and employing the first full-time announcers in 1923. The station's first announcer on its opening night was its general manager Percy Edgar, who was to be the dominant figure in Birmingham broadcasting and the BBC's most influential regional director until his retirement in 1948.

5IT moved its studios from Witton to a former cinema in New Street in 1923, moving again in 1926 to a completely new building in Broad Street with two studios – one of the largest the country, if not Europe. The Broad Street studios now controlled and made programmes for a region stretching across central England from The Potteries to Norfolk.

From 21 August 1927 the low-powered city station 5IT was replaced by the 5GB (the BBC Midland Region) – the first of the BBC's regional services – broadcast from the new high powered  Daventry transmitting station at Borough Hill near Daventry.

References

Bibliography 

1922 establishments in England
1927 disestablishments in England
Defunct radio stations in the United Kingdom
Radio stations in Birmingham, West Midlands
Radio stations established in 1922
Radio stations disestablished in 1927